Nashville Jail is an album by the progressive bluegrass band Country Gentlemen — their first classic lineup (Waller-Duffey-Adcock-Gray). Recorded in 1964 when the band was with Mercury Records, the album was not released until 1990 by Copper Creek Records.

Track listing 
 Nashville Jail (Don McHan) 2:04
 This World's No Place to Live (John Duffey, Hill) 2:57
 Electricity (Murphy) 2:17
 Azzurro Campana (Eddie Adcock, John Duffey) 2:28
 Brown Mountain Light (Scotty Wiseman) 3:18
 A Cold Wind Blowing (Duffey, Hill) 2:20
 Uncle Joe (Eddie Adcock) 2:26
 She's Long, She's Tall (Rodgers) 2:51
 Theme from Exodus (Ernest Gold) 2:28
 Flowers by My Grave (Allen, Duffey) 2:52
 Are You Waiting Just for Me (Ernest Tubb) 2:38

Personnel 
 Charlie Waller - guitar, vocals
 John Duffey - mandolin, guitar, vocals
 Eddie Adcock - banjo, vocals
 Tom Gray - bass, vocals

and
 Pete Kuykendall - guitar, engineer, liner notes, producer
 Ed Ferris - bass

References

External links 
 The Country Gentlemen discography page at lpdiscography.com

1990 albums
Mercury Records albums
The Country Gentlemen albums